Watson Yuill was the third man on the Avondale Heather CC (from Strathaven, Scotland) during the World Curling Championships known as the 1960 Scotch Cup, where Scottish team won silver medal. The team won The Rink Championship in 1960.

References 

Year of birth missing (living people)
Living people
People from Strathaven
Sportspeople from South Lanarkshire
Scottish male curlers